Sheila R. Bleck (born October 14, 1974) is an American retired professional female bodybuilder.

Early life and education
Bleck was born in Coos Bay, Oregon, along with her identical twin sister, Sherry. Their mother, Rebecca, was young and unmarried, and they never knew their father. Bleck has spoken of the abuse she and her sister suffered at the hands of babysitters between the ages of three and five years old. Eventually, Bleck's working mother asked the twins' grandmother to step in and take care of them.

In 1992, Sheila, who describes herself as having always been athletic, graduated from North Bend High School.

Bodybuilding career

Amateur
At the age of twelve, Bleck's mother bought her and her sister their first weight bench. She cites actor Sylvester Stallone's character Rocky Balboa and the Incredible Hulk as her early inspirations. Bleck, by that time a modern dancer, would not begin lifting seriously until the age of 16, when she joined a powerlifting. Her first trainer was Jake Grabow of Better Builds Gym, from whom she received an education on eating and posing. Not long after high school graduation, Bleck started competing as a bodybuilder.

In 2008, in winning the NPC Nationals, she obtained her IFBB pro card.

Professional
In 2009, John Romano became Bleck's prep coach for her pro career, although her current prep coach is Dave Palumbo. In 2010, she came in a close second at her first professional competition, the 2010 New York Pro. She lost to Cathy LeFrançois by just one point. Since 2010, she has been in the top six of every professional bodybuilding competition in which she has competed, with the exception of the 2014 Ms. Olympia. At the 2016 Rising Phoenix World Championships, Bleck came in 2nd place overall and won the Best Poser Award.

Contest history
 1993 Bill Pearl Classic - 2nd (HW)
 1995 Oregon Coast Champ - 1st (HW)
 1998 Oregon State Champ - 1st (HW)
 1999 Oregon State Champ - 1st (HW)
 2000 Oregon State Champ - 1st
 2000 Emerald Cup 2000 - 1st
 2000 USAs Nationals - 16th
 2002 Contra Costa - 1st
 2003 Nationals - 6th (HW)
 2005 National - 11th
 2006 USAs Nationals - 3rd
 2006 Nationals - 3rd
 2007 USAs Nationals - 2nd
 2008 Nationals - 1st
 2010 IFBB New York Pro - 2nd
 2010 IFBB Ms. Olympia - 4th
 2011 IFBB Ms. Olympia - 6th
 2012 IFBB Tampa Pro - 2nd and Best Poser Award
 2012 IFBB Ms. Olympia - 6th
 2014 IFBB Tampa Pro - 1st and Best Poser Award
 2014 IFBB Ms. Olympia - 7th
 2016 IFBB Tampa Pro - 1st
 2016 IFBB Rising Phoenix World Championships – 2nd and Best Poser Award
 2017 IFBB Tampa Pro - 1st
 2017 IFBB WOS Rising Phoenix World Championships – 2nd and Best Poser Award
 2018 IFBB WOS Rising Phoenix World Championships – 3rd

Personal life
Bleck currently resides in Vancouver, WA.

Her sister Sherry started boxing competitively at age 19 and did so for six years with the USA Amateur Boxing Association. She fought as a welterweight and had an undefeated 10–0 career. Sherry has also competed in amateur bodybuilding three times (2004, 2005 and 2007) and took two overall titles and one 2nd place. They remain close to this day.

See also
Female bodybuilding
List of female professional bodybuilders

References

External links

1974 births
American expatriates in Sweden
American female bodybuilders
Living people
People from Coos Bay, Oregon
Professional bodybuilders
Sportspeople from Oregon
Sportspeople from Stockholm
Sportspeople from Tampa, Florida
21st-century American women